Stephanie Cullen (born 27 November 1980 in Bury) is a business woman and former British rower. She was part of the British squad that topped the medal table at the 2011 World Rowing Championships in Bled, where she won a gold medal as part of the lightweight quad sculls with Imogen Walsh, Kathryn Twyman and Andrea Dennis.

Cullen attended Bury Grammar School and went on to study chemistry at the University of Oxford, Hertford College, where she obtained her master’s degree (MChem). It was during her time at Oxford that she discovered a talent for rowing, and she became Boatclub Captain, then President, leading the women’s 1st and 2nd VIII to a historic double blades in the Summer Eights 2002 and win the Boatrace with the Oxford University Women's Lightweight Rowing Club by 2 lengths in 2003. Her portrait now hangs in Hertford College hall in acknowledgment of her achievements

After the 2011 World Championships, Cullen retired from elite rowing and pursued her professional career in the corporate sector. She is currently the UK Head of Manufacturing for IRI and was formerly Head of Business Insight for Britvic.  In 2018 she was named as one of the ‘20 in Data & Technology’ by Women in Data

References

 

1980 births
Living people
English female rowers
Sportspeople from Bury, Greater Manchester
World Rowing Championships medalists for Great Britain